Marilyn McIntyre (born May 23, 1949) is an American television and film actress.

Early life and career 
She started her career in theatre/stage performances and appeared in leading roles on Broadway, Off & Off Off Broadway and in many of the country's leading regional theatres, including the Arena Stage (Washington, DC), Mark Taper Forum, South Coast Repertory, Houston's Alley Theatre, Missouri Rep, Walnut Street Theatre, and many others. She received her training (BFA Degree) at the North Carolina School of the Arts, and her MFA in the graduate program at Pennsylvania State University. Ms. McIntyre is an acting teacher and coach, currently teaching at California State University Northridge, North Carolina's Elon University summer program, "Elon in LA: Climing the LAdder", and the private Howard Fine Acting Studio and Ted Brunetti Studio, both in Hollywood. McIntyre was born in Erie, Pennsylvania, the daughter of Jeanne Ellen (née Corzilius) and Roger McIntyre, an aeronautical engineer.

Films

She has had contract (series regular) roles in the television series Watch Over Me, Days of Our Lives, One Life to Live, Loving, and Search for Tomorrow, and recurring guest star roles on LA Law, Judging Amy, General Hospital: Night Shift, General Hospital, The Young and the Restless, and Ryan's Hope. Ms. McIntyre has had guest star roles on numerous television series including Chicago Hope, The X-Files, Dark Skies, among several others, and her film appearances include the recent hit of several shorts film festivals, Into the Unknown, starring opposite her real-life significant other, James Harper; the smash-hit short, George Lucas in Love; First Daughter, What's Bugging Seth (2005), The Ring Two (2005), and several others.

References

External links

American film actresses
American television actresses
1949 births
Living people
21st-century American women